Trigonopterus cuprescens is a species of flightless weevil in the genus Trigonopterus from Indonesia.

Etymology
The specific name is derived from the Latin word cuprescens, meaning 'coppery'.

Description
Individuals measure 2.72–3.05 mm in length.  Females are slightly slenderer than males.  The general coloration is black, except for the pronotum and elytra, which are coppery-bronze in color, and the legs and antennae, which are rust-colored.  In some individuals, the pronotum and elytra will have a green or red tint.

Range

Phylogeny
T. cuprescens is part of the T. dimorphus species group.

References

cuprescens
Beetles described in 2014
Beetles of Asia
Insects of Indonesia